The 2003–04 FA Cup was the 123rd staging of England and the world's oldest football competition, the FA Cup. The competition began on 23 August 2003, with the lowest-ranked of the entrants competing in the Extra Preliminary round. In the Third Round, the clubs from the Premiership and Division One competed in the competition for the first time.

The semi-finals were staged at neutral venues and, like the final, would not be replayed in the event of a draw. The competition culminated with the cup final at the Millennium Stadium, Cardiff for a fourth year in a row, since Wembley Stadium was still in the rebuilding process. The cup was won by Manchester United for a record 11th time, with a 3–0 victory over Millwall from Division One.

The appearance in the Cup Final by Millwall, a Level 2 team, marked the first time in 12 years that a team outside Level 1 of the English football pyramid appeared in the final game.

Calendar

First round proper

This round is the first in which Football League teams from Second and Third Division compete with non-league teams. Luton's Adrian Forbes and Sheffield Wednesday's Adam Proudlock netted hat tricks. Shildon AFC, of the Arngrove Northern League (level 9 on the football league pyramid), were the lowest ranked team left in the competition in the first round.
Ties were played over the weekend of 8 November 2003.

Second round proper
Ties were played over the weekend of 6 December 2003. Mansfield's Liam Lawrence showed how interested Championship and premiership clubs were with him by netting a hat trick.

Third round proper
This round marks the first time First Division and Premier League (top-flight) teams play. Matches were played on the weekend of Saturday, 3 January 2004, with replays on 13 January and 14 January.

Fourth round proper
Ties played during the weekend of 24 January 2004, with replays on 3 February and 4 February.

The match between Tottenham Hotspur and Manchester City was particularly notable. Tottenham led the match 3–0 at half-time but Manchester City turned the match around in the second half to win 4–3, with Jon Macken scoring the winning goal in the 90th minute. This was despite Manchester City having one less player on the pitch during the second half after Joey Barton was red carded during the half-time interval.

Fifth round proper
Matches played weekend of 14 and 15 February 2004
 Three replays played week commencing 22 and 25 February 2004.
 Four non-Premiership sides (including a Division Two side) progressed to the quarter-finals.

Sixth round proper
Matches played on the weekend of Saturday, 6 March 2004.
There was one replay between Tranmere and Millwall, played on Tuesday 16 March.
Two Division One sides progressed to the semi-finals, while another was eliminated at this stage. In addition, a Division Two side reached the quarter-finals and were only eliminated after a replay.

Replay

Semi-finals
Matches played on the weekend of Saturday, 3 April 2004.
Two teams from Division 1 featured in the semi-finals (Millwall and Sunderland) who faced each other. The other tie was an all-Premiership affair between Manchester United and Arsenal, held at Villa Park.
Both games were played at neutral venues.

Final

Manchester United won the game and lifted the trophy for the 11th time in their history (a competition record) with a 3–0 victory over a Millwall side who were the first team from outside the top flight to reach the FA Cup final in 12 years.

Media coverage
In the United Kingdom, the BBC were the free to air broadcasters for the third consecutive season while Sky Sports were the subscription broadcasters for the sixteenth consecutive season.

The matches shown live on the BBC were: Accrington Stanley 1–0 Huddersfield Town (R1); Burton Albion 0–1 Hartlepool United (R2); Southampton 0–3 Newcastle United and Yeovil Town 0–2 Liverpool (R3); Liverpool 2–1 Newcastle United and Manchester City 1–1 Tottenham Hotspur (R4); Sunderland 1–1 Birmingham City and Arsenal 2–1 Chelsea (R5); Portsmouth 1–5 Arsenal and Millwall 0–0 Tranmere Rovers (QF); Arsenal 0–1 Manchester United (SF); and Manchester United 3–0 Millwall (Final).

References

 
2003-04
2003–04 domestic association football cups
FA